Cysteine metabolism refers to the biological pathways that consume or create cysteine.  The pathways of different amino acids and other metabolites interweave and overlap to creating complex systems.cysteine is metabolism creating complex systems

Human cysteine metabolism
In human cysteine metabolism, L-cysteine is consumed in several ways as shown below. L-Cysteine is also consumed in methionine and glutathione metabolism as well as pantothenate/coenzyme A biosynthesis.

L-Cysteine is the product of several processes as well.  In addition to the reactions below, L-cysteine is also a product of glycine, serine, and threonine metabolism.

See also
 D-cysteine desulfhydrase
 Sulfur metabolism

Sulfur metabolism
Sulfur amino acids